Geld.Macht.Liebe is a German television series. Die Serie wurde wegen zu schlechter Quoten nach der ersten Staffel eingestellt. Eine Neuauflage oder Fortsetzung ist nicht geplant.

See also
List of German television series

References

External links
 

2009 German television series debuts
2009 German television series endings
German-language television shows
Television shows set in Frankfurt
Das Erste original programming